{{Infobox company
| name = Camelot Co., Ltd.
| trade_name = Camelot Software Planning
| logo = Camelot Software Planning logo.png
| type = Kabushiki gaisha
| native_name = 株式会社キャメロット
| native_name_lang = ja
| romanized_name = Kabushiki gaisha Kyamerotto
| former_names = Sega CD4 (Consumer Development Studio 4)Sonic! Software Planning
| foundation =  (As Sonic! Software Planning) (As Camelot Co. Ltd)
| location = Tokyo, Japan
| key_people = Hiroyuki TakahashiShugo TakahashiMotoi Sakuraba
| industry = Video games
| products = {{unbulleted list|Shining series|Beyond the Beyond|Everybody's Golf|Golden Sun series|Mario sports games}}
| revenue = 
| parent = Sega (1990–1995)
| num_employees = 37 (as of June 2022)
| homepage = 
}}

 (doing business as Camelot Software Planning) is a Japanese video game developer established in 1990 under the name Sega CD4, but quickly renamed to Sonic! Software Planning. Named after Sonic the Hedgehog, they were closely involved with Sega and responsible for initial development of the Shining series. In 1995, there was a brief period where they worked for Sony Computer Entertainment in addition to creating Shining products.

By 2001, now known as Camelot, they had partnered with Nintendo to create the Mario Tennis and Mario Golf series of sports games, as well as the role-playing video game series Golden Sun.

 History 
Camelot was founded in 1990 as a division of Sega known as Sega CD4 (Consumer Development Studio #4), soon changing their name to Sonic! Software Planning, which was formed to create, alongside Climax Entertainment, Shining in the Darkness for the Sega Mega Drive/Genesis. The studio also developed other successful games in the franchise, including Shining Force and Shining Force II. In 1995, Sonic! officially separated from Sega, but agreed to continue developing games for the Shining series and to not release any games for rival systems that would threaten the success of the Shining franchise

By Shining Force III, the studio had begun operating under its current name, Camelot Software Planning. In late 1998, Sega began focusing their resources on the Dreamcast, leaving Camelot with their final Shining Force III scenario, for the Sega Saturn, in jeopardy. Though the scenario was released, Camelot decided to move away from Sega completely and have since worked mostly for Nintendo.

The company developed many Mario sports games, including Mario Golf, and Mario Tennis, as well as the Golden Sun series of role-playing games.
 
The creation of the Mario character, Waluigi, can be attributed to Camelot Software, after Mario creator Shigeru Miyamoto consulted with them to create a "Wario-like" counterpart for Luigi during the development of Mario Tennis.

 Developed games 

Cancelled
 I Love Golf'' – (PC)

Notes

References

External links
  

Video game companies of Japan
Video game development companies
Software companies based in Tokyo
Nintendo divisions and subsidiaries
Video game companies established in 1990
Japanese companies established in 1990